An Evening with Adele was the debut concert tour by English singer-songwriter Adele, in support of her debut studio album, 19. The tour was unusual in that it included few dates in the United Kingdom, Adele's home country and the territory where 19 was the most successful. Instead, the tour focused heavily on North America. Adele and the tour gained some notoriety when she cancelled tour dates in 2008 in order to spend time with her then-boyfriend, an incident she later expressed regret over. One of the last performances on the tour took place at the historic Hollywood Bowl. Etta James was supposed to appear at the performance but cancelled at the last-minute due to illness and was replaced by Chaka Khan. The last performance of the tour was at the North Sea Jazz Festival.

An official tour book containing exclusive pictures and behind-the-scene information of the tour is available for purchase on Adele's official site.

Opening acts
The Script (North America, early 2009)
James Morrison (North America, January 2009)
Sam Sparro (United Kingdom, mid-2008)
Jenny Lindfors (Ireland, mid-2008)

Setlist

Encore

Source:

Tour dates

Festivals and other miscellaneous performances
This concert was a part of the 'Bonnaroo Music Festival'
This concert was a part of the 'Montreux Jazz Festival'
This concert was a part of the 'Summer Series'
This concert was a part of the 'Little Noise Sessions'
This concert was a part of the 'iTunes Festival'
This concert was a part of the 'North Sea Jazz Festival'

Box office score data

Broadcasts and recordings
The concert at The Roundhouse (a part of the iTunes Festival) was recorded and released as iTunes Live from SoHo.

References

External links
Adele's Official Website
Adele's gigography on Songkick
Adele's gigography on Last.FM

2008 concert tours
2009 concert tours
Adele concert tours